Jacky Morael (26 November 1959 – 6 December 2016) was a Belgian politician.

References

1959 births
2016 deaths
Ecolo politicians